Digidogheadlock is the seventh album by Japanese band The Mad Capsule Markets and their first to receive a European release. The album explored the sound that would later be used on their following album, Osc-Dis. TORUxxx stepped in on guitar for this album, although Takeshi Ueda recorded guitar on the track "Asphalt Beach". This album gained the band recognition by Digital Hardcore Recordings founder and Atari Teenage Riot frontman Alec Empire, who remixed two tracks and invited the band to tour with ATR. The album was released two years before the breakthrough album Osc-Dis, but there was little international interest at the time. The song "3:31" is a reference to vocalist Kyono's birthdate.

Track listing
All tracks by Takeshi Ueda except where noted.

"Crash Pow" – 3:38
"Systematic" – 4:18
"What" – 3:10
"Water!" – 3:43
"Have No Fear" (Kyono) – 2:45 
"Sickly Bug" – 3:21
"JMP" – 3:36
"3.31" (Kyono) – 4:28
"Asphalt-Beach" – 3:39
"Lose It" – 4:14
"Freak Is Born" (Kyono) – 1:17
"Do Justice To Yourself, Do Justice To My Life" – 2:20
"Creature" – 4:18
"Systematic" (Audio Active Remix) (European version only)
"Creature" (Alec Empire Mix) (European version only)
"Crash Pow" (Digital Hardcore Mix) (US bonus track)

Personnel
Takeshi Ueda – bass, guitar, programming, vocals
TORUxxx – guitar
Motokatsu Miyagami – drums
Hiroshi Kyono – vocals
Mad Capsule Markets – producer
Yutaka Goto – executive producer
Kei Kusama – programming
Masanobu Murakami – assistant engineer
Gary Stout – mixing
Kazushige Yamazaki – mastering

Charts

Regional differences
This album was released in Europe with a yellow cover (with no lyrical translations and a contains a typing error on the track listing), and in the U.S. with a purple cover. The US version only contains the two remixes by Alec Empire, whereas European version features an extra remix by the Japanese electronic band Audio Active. both of these versions are out of print, and very hard to find.

The Mad Capsule Markets albums
1997 albums
1998 albums